Charles Emil Lewenhaupt the Elder (28 March 1691 – 4 August 1743) was a Swedish general.

Biography
Lewenhaupt was born to Count Carl Gustaf Löwenhaupt and Countess Amalia Königsmarck. At the age of 16, he entered Dutch service where he was promoted to the rank of captain in 1709. A year later he entered Swedish service. He was promoted to lieutenant colonel and participated at the battle of Gadebusch in 1712.

In 1720, Lewenhaupt married Beata Cronhielm. The couple had one son, Charles Emil Lewenhaupt the Younger. In 1722, he was promoted to major general. At the Riksdag of the Estates of 1741, he was a factor in the decision to wage war against Imperial Russia, in what became the Russo-Swedish War of 1741–1743.

Following the war, on 20 June 1743, Lewenhaupt was sentenced to death on grounds of poor performance and conduct in the war. The execution was set to 20 July, and later postponed to 30 July. Lewenhaupts' son and a small party managed to free him, but Lewenhaupt was re-arrested when aboard a vessel in the Stockholm archipelago bound for Danzig. On 4 August 1743, Lewenhaupt was decapitated at Norrtull in Stockholm.

References

Bibliography 
 

1691 births
1743 deaths
18th-century executions by Sweden
18th-century Swedish military personnel
Executed Swedish people
People executed by Sweden by decapitation
Military personnel from Stockholm
People of the Russo-Swedish War (1741–1743)
Swedish generals
Swedish military personnel of the Great Northern War
Swedish people of German descent